This is a list of United States Air Force reconnaissance squadrons.  It covers units considered to be part of the Combat Air Force (CAF) such as bomb and fighter squadrons and serves as a break out of the comprehensive List of United States Air Force squadrons.  Units in this list are primarily assigned to Air Combat Command in the United States Air Force.

When squadrons are deployed on operations overseas their names are temporarily changed to include the word "expeditionary", although when they return the names revert. However, there are some units which include the word "Expeditionary" all the time; these squadrons are provisional and may activate and inactivate at any time.

Expeditionary Reconnaissance Squadrons (ERS)

Reconnaissance Squadrons (RS)

See also

 904th Air Refueling Squadron
 List of United States Air Force squadrons

References

Reconnaissance
 *